The 1946  Texas A&M Aggies football team was an American football team that represented Texas A&M University in the Southwest Conference (SWC) during the 1946 college football season. In their 13th season under head coach Homer Norton, the Aggies compiled a 4–6 record (4–2 against SWC opponents), tied for third place in the SWC, and outscored all opponents by a total of 125 to 107. They played their home games at Kyle Field in College Station, Texas.

Three Texas A&M players received honors from the Associated Press (AP) or United Press (UP) on the 1946 All-Southwest Conference football team: tackle Monte Moncrief (AP-2, UP-2); guard Odell Stautzenberger (AP-2, UP-2); and back Willie Zapalac (UP-2).

Schedule

1947 NFL Draft

The 1947 NFL Draft was held on December 16, 1946. The following Aggies were selected.

References

Texas AandM
Texas A&M Aggies football seasons
Texas AandM Aggies football